Constantin Fahlberg (22 December 1850 in Tambov – 15 August 1910 in Nassau, aged 59) was a Russian chemist who discovered the sweet taste of anhydroorthosulphaminebenzoic acid  in 1877–78 when analysing the chemical compounds in coal tar at Johns Hopkins University for Professor Ira Remsen (1846–1927, aged 81). Later Fahlberg gave this chemical "body" the trade name Saccharin.

External links
Four patents by Fahlberg on the synthesis of saccharin.

1850 births
1910 deaths
Russian chemists
Russian inventors
19th-century American chemists
19th-century German chemists